Stirling, also known as Stirling Plantation, is a historic plantation house located near Massaponax, Spotsylvania County, Virginia. It was built between 1858 and 1860, and is a -story, five-bay, brick Greek Revival and Federal dwelling. It measures 56 feet by 36 feet, and has a hipped roof and four interior end chimneys. It sits on a raised basement and features entrance porches added about 1912. Also on the property are the contributing kitchen dependency, smokehouse, family cemetery, and the undisturbed archaeological sites of a weaving house and three slave cabins.

It was listed on the National Register of Historic Places in 1989.

References

Plantation houses in Virginia
Houses on the National Register of Historic Places in Virginia
Archaeological sites on the National Register of Historic Places in Virginia
Greek Revival houses in Virginia
Federal architecture in Virginia
Houses completed in 1860
Houses in Spotsylvania County, Virginia
National Register of Historic Places in Spotsylvania County, Virginia
Slave cabins and quarters in the United States